Eline (Ellen Marie) Heger, née Schmidt (13 December 1774 in Copenhagen – 6 June 1842 in Tårbæk), was a Danish stage actress.

She was the daughter of Thomas Schmidt and Anne Reinsdorf. Her mother washed clothes for a living, and placed her a student in the ballet school of the Royal Danish Theatre in 1789. She debuted as an actress in 1793 and was employed in 1794. She was to be famed as a tragic heroine on stage.

Among her admirers were Knud Lyne Rahbek and Henrich Steffen. Adam Oehlenschläger is considered to have used her as a role model for the Nordic heroine in his tragedies, and it is for her interpretations of his plays that she is most known. She retired after a stroke in 1832.

Married to the actor Stephan Heger in 1797, she was the mother of Elise Holst, who replaced her in the same parts she used to play at the theatre after her retirement.

List of roles

1790s
 1793	Den gode moder as Lucette
 1793	Emilie Galotti as Emilie Galotti
 1794	Han blander sig i alt as Charlotte
 1794	Pigen fra Marienborg as Cathinka
 1794	Vejen til ødelæggelse as Sophie Freelove
 1795	Barselstuen as Engelke Hattemagers
 1795	De aftakkede officerer as Lovise
 1795	De fire formyndere as Miss Nancy Lovely
 1795	De to søskende as Mariane
 1795	De to venner as Pauline
 1795	Den godmodige familie as Sophie
 1795	Gamle og nye sæder as Kirstine
 1795	Hekseri as Terentia
 1795	Juliane von Lindorak as Juliane von Lindorak
 1795	Kjolen fra Lyon as Constance von Birbak
 1795	Ringen as Komtesse Wildhelm
 1795	Ægteskabsskolen as Charlotte Silkeborg
 1796	Advokaterne as Fredericia
 1796	Armod og høimodighed as Lovise
 1796	Barselstuen as Engelke Hattemagers
 1796	Bortførelsen as Henriette
 1796	Den lykkelige familie as	Clara
 1796	Den politiske kandestøber as Raadsherreinde
 1796	Den skarpe kniv kan let faa skaar as Wilhelmine
 1796	Det tyvende aars ægteskab as Marie Lønberg
 1796	Dyveke as Dyveke
 1796	Høstdagen as Amalila Fersen
 1796	Jøden as Elise
 1796	Kuren as Constane
 1796	Rejsen til byen as Salome
 1796	Ulysses von Ithacia as Pallas
 1796	Væddemaalet as Frøken Adelaide
 1796	Ægtefolkene fra landet as Karoline Bernhard
 1797	Armod og høimodig as Lovise
 1797	De fire formyndere as Miss Nancy Lovely
 1797	De noble passioner as Leonore
 1797	Den gode moder as Lucette
 1797	Den godmodige familie as Sophie
 1797	Den politiske kandestøber as Raadsherreinde
 1797	Den sanseløse as Isabella
 1797	Dyveke as Dyveke
 1797	Emilie Galotti as Emilie Galotti
 1797	Galejslaven as Amalia
 1797	Gamle og nye sæder as Kirstine
 1797	Han blander sig i alt as Charlotte
 1797	Ja eller nej as Julie / Antonette
 1797	Juliane von Lindorak''' as Juliane von Lindorak
 1797	Jægerne as Frederikke
 1797	Jøden as Elise
 1797	Kjolen fra Lyon as Constance von Birbak
 1797	Manden paa fyrretyve aar as Julie
 1797	Niels Ebbesen af Nørreris as Estrith
 1797	Pigen fra Marienborg as Cathinka
 1797	Sammensværgelsen mod Peter den Store as Cyrilla
 1797	Ægtefolkene fra landet as Karoline Bernhard
 1798	De to poststationer as Wilhelmine
 1798	Falsk undseelse as Wilhelmine
 1798	Gamle og nye sæder as Kirstine
 1798	Han blander sig i alt as Charlotte
 1798	Heckingborn as Lady Fletscher
 1798	Høstdagen as Amalila Fersen
 1798	Rejsen til byen as Salome
 1798	Ringen as Henriette von Darring
 1798	Skumlerne as Jenny
 1798	Ægteskabsskolen as Charlotte Silkeborg
 1799	Armod og høimodighed as Lovise
 1799	Barselstuen as Engelke Hattemagers
 1799	Bortførelsen as Henriette
 1799	Den forladte datter as Lovise
 1799	Den godmodige familie as Sophie
 1799	Emigranterne as Adelaide d'Arras

1800s
 1800	Advokaterne as Fredericia
 1800	Beverley as Henriette, Beverley's soster
 1800	De aftakkede officerer as Lovise
 1800	De noble passioner as Leonore
 1800	Emilie Galotti as Emilie Galotti
 1800	Fredsmægleren as Lucilie
 1800	Herman von Unna as Sophie
 1800	Korsikanerne as Ottilia
 1801	Armod og højmodighed as Lovise
 1801	Barselstuen as Dame
 1801	Den forladte datter as Lovise
 1801	Den værdige fader as Sophie
 1802	Armod og høimodighed as Lovise
 1802	Den forladte datter as Lovise
 1802	Herman von Unna as Sophie
 1802	Niels Ebbesen af Nørreris as Estrith
 1802	Octavia as Octavia
 1802	Onkelrollen as Louise
 1802	Væddemaalet as Frøken Adelaide
 1803	Barselstuen as Dame
 1803	De aftakkede officerer as Lovise
 1803	De noble passioner as Leonore
 1803	Den forladte datter as Lovise
 1803	Dyveke as Dyveke
 1803	Eugenie as Eugenie
 1803	Falsk undseelse as Wilhelmine
 1803	Heckingborn as Lady Fletscher
 1803	Ringen as Ubekendt
 1804	Advokaterne as Fredericia
 1804	Barselstuen as Dame
 1805	Barselstuen as Dame
 1805	Den forladte datter as Lovise
 1805	Heckingborn as Lady Fletscher
 1805	Juliane von Lindorak as Juliane von Lindorak
 1805	Niels Ebbesen af Nørreris as Estrith
 1805	Selim, prins af Algier as Irena
 1806	Armod og høimodighed as Lovise
 1806	Den politiske kandestøber as Raadsherreinde
 1806	Emilie Galotti as Emilie Galotti
 1806	Ægtefolkene fra landet as Karoline Bernhard
 1807	Barselstuen as Dame
 1807	Herman von Unna as Sophie
 1807	Kjolen fra Lyon as Constance von Birbak
 1807	Tvekampen as	Laura
 1808	Den forladte datter as Lovise
 1808	Falsk undseelse as Wilhelmine
 1809	Advokaterne as Fredericia
 1809	Han blander sig i alt asCharlotte

1810s
 1810	Armod og højmodighed as Lovise
 1810	Den forladte datter as Lovise
 1810	Heckingborn as Lady Fletscher
 1810	Menneskehad og anger as Eulalia
 1810	Ringen as Ubekendt
 1810	Snedkeren i Lifland as Eudoxia Mazeppa
 1812	Advokaterne as Fredericia
 1812	Den forladte datter as Lovise
 1814	General Schlenzheim og hans familie as Sophie
 1816	Armod og Høimodighed as Lovise
 1816	Balders død as Nanna
 1817	Sammensværgelsen mod Peter den Store as Natalia
 1819	Menneskehad og anger as Eulalia

192+s
 1820	Herman von Unna	Sophie
 1821	Falsk undseelse as Fru Heldmand
 1822	Barselstuen as Dame
 1823	Embedsiver as Hofraadinde Rosen
 1823	Skumlerne as Emilie
 1824	Niels Ebbesen af Nørreris	Jutta 1826	Dyveke	Sigbrit
 1826	Hamlet as Gertrud
 1826	Myndlingerne as Madame Drave
 1827	Emilie Galotti as Claudia Galotti
 1828	Romeo og Julie as Fru Capulet
 1829	Hamlet as Ofelia
 1829	Jøden as Madame Rathcliffe
 1829	Ringen as Fru von Darring
 1830	De muntre koner i  Windsor as Margaret Page
 1832	Magt og list''

References 
 Dansk Kvindebiografisk Leksikon

19th-century Danish actresses
Danish stage actresses
1774 births
1842 deaths
18th-century Danish actresses